HMS Hong Kong may refer to one of two vessels:

, a steam tender
, a Colony-class frigate

Royal Navy ship names